Benoît Mourlon (born 14 July 1988) is a French footballer who plays as midfielder for Auxerre in the French Ligue 1.

References

External links
 Profile at Skynetblogs

French footballers
1988 births
AJ Auxerre players
Ligue 1 players
Living people
Association football midfielders